The 2020–21 season is TD Systems Baskonia's 62nd in existence and the club's 39th consecutive season in the top flight of Spanish basketball and the 21st consecutive season in the EuroLeague. It is the second consecutive season under head coach Duško Ivanović.

Times up to 24 October 2020 and from 28 March 2021 are CEST (UTC+2). Times from 25 October 2020 to 27 March 2021 are CET (UTC+1).

Overview

Pre-season
TD Systems Baskonia officially set its sights on the 2020–21 season as the club started its training camp for the coming campaign on August 11. Baskonia came into 2019–20 having played in the playoffs the previous four seasons, including the Final Four in 2015–16. But the team last season slumped to a 12–16 record and 13th place in the standings when the COVID-19 outbreak ended the campaign. Head coach Duško Ivanović joined the club in December 2019 and helped Baskonia take the 2020 Spanish League title. He guided Baskonia to the EuroLeague Finals in 2001 and to the EuroLeague Championship Game in 2005. Now, with new additions such as Rokas Giedraitis, Alec Peters and Tonye Jekiri, the club aims to return to the EuroLeague Playoffs, at least, in 2020–21.

Players

Squad information

Depth chart

Transactions

In

|}

Out

|}

Pre-season and friendlies

Friendly match

Euskal Kopa

Friendly matches

Competitions

Overview

Liga ACB

League table

Results summary

Results by round

Matches

ACB Playoffs

Quarterfinals

EuroLeague

League table

Results summary

Results by round

Matches

Copa del Rey

Quarterfinals

Semifinals

Supercopa de España

Semifinals

References

External links
 

 
Baskonia
Baskonia